Omega (Ѡ ѡ or Ѡ ѡ; italics: Ѡ ѡ or Ѡ ѡ) is a letter used in the early Cyrillic alphabet. Its name and capital form are derived directly from the Greek letter Omega (Ω ω).

In some forms it looks similar to the letter We.

Unlike Greek, the Slavic languages had only a single  sound, so Omega was little used compared to the letter O (О о), descended from the Greek letter Omicron.  In the older ustav writing Omega was used mainly for its numeric value of 800, and rarely appeared even in Greek words.  In later semi-ustav manuscripts it was used for decorative purposes, along with the broad version as well as the Broad On (Ѻ ѻ).

Modern Church Slavonic has developed strict rules for the use of these letterforms.  

Another variation of omega is the ornate or beautiful omega, used as an interjection, “O!”.  It is represented in Unicode 5.1 by the misnamed character omega with titlo. It descends from the Greek omega with the smooth breathing (psili) and circumflex (perispomeni) diacritical marks (Ὦ ὦ), also used in the corresponding exclamation in ancient Greek.

Computing codes

See also
 Latin omega

External links
 A Berdnikov and O Lapko, "Old Slavonic and Church Slavonic in TEX and Unicode", EuroTEX ’99 Proceedings, September 1999 (PDF)

References

Vowel letters